Kornélia Prielle (June 1, 1826 – February 25, 1906), was a Hungarian stage actress. She was the first actor to be honored by being a Perpetual Member of the National Theatre in Budapest, and is counted as a member of the pioneer generation there.

Life
Kornélia Prielle was the daughter of a French immigrant and stable worker, Joseph Prielle. She and her siblings were active in travelling theater companies as children. In 1841, she debuted officially at the stage in Szatmárnémeti (now Satu Mare, Romania). She made her first performance at the National Theatre in Budapest in 1844. She was engaged at the National Theatre from 1861 until her death, and was made actor for life at the theatre in 1881.

Personal life
 
She married four times. Her first marriage with Kálmán Szerdahelyi lasted from 1847 until 1848. Between 1849 and 1853 she was married to Elek Hidassy. Then she married Szerdahelyi again. Two months before her death she married Kálmán Rozsnyay in 1905.

She was a Reformed Christian and of her father's side of French descent.

References

External links

1826 births
1906 deaths
People from Sighetu Marmației
Actresses from Budapest
19th-century Hungarian actresses
Hungarian Calvinist and Reformed Christians
Hungarian people of French descent